A pretzel is a baked snack.

Pretzel may also refer to:

Pretzel (picture book), a 1944 children's picture book by Margret & H. A. Rey
Pretzel Amusement Ride Company, the dark ride manufacturer
Pretzels Getzien (1864–1932), German baseball player
Pretzel Pezzullo (1910–1990), American baseball player
Pretzel Syndrome